Antratsyt or Antratsit is a city in the Luhansk region of Ukraine. Until 1962 it was known as Bokove-Antratsyt.

The city is located in the southern part of the Luhansk Oblast (region). Antratsyt is incorporated as a city of oblast significance and is the centre of Antratsyt Municipality which includes six urban-type settlements. It also serves as the administrative centre of Antratsyt Raion (district), though it does not belong to the raion. Antratsyt came under control of pro-Russian separatists in early 2014, and was incorporated into the Lugansk People's Republic. After the 2022 annexation referendums in Russian-occupied Ukraine, Russia claimed the city as part of Russia.

Origin
Antratsyt is appropriately named after its large supply of anthracite, a type of coal valuable because of its high carbon content and low levels of impurities, making it especially desirable for home heating and metallurgical applications.

History
Evidence from archeological finds and burial mounds from 30,000 BC indicates the Saltovo-Mayaki were Antratsyt's earliest ancestors. Since the Saltovo-Mayaki were nomadic, the area was left uninhabited and considered part of the Wild Fields. It was only in the late 16th century that the Don Cossacks claimed the area, protecting it from Tatar and Mongol raids, and started farming settlements. In 1874, Cossack Ivan Dvuzhenov found coal nearby and by 1904, the Antratsyt Bokovsky Coal Mine was built. A small settlement grew around the mine and soon after, the Kolberg Coal Mine was built in 1912, allowing the settlement to grow and prosper. In 1920, the town was officially named Bokovo-Antratsyt after its first coal mine, which was later shortened to Antratsyt (1962). With the creation of the Soviet Union in 1922, the town became under the Ukrainian Soviet Socialist Republic's rule. As an important center for coal extraction, the city was made a rayon center in 1936. From July 18, 1942 to February 19, 1943, the city was occupied by Nazi troops. Led by I.E. Voropayev, the city retaliated and regained its freedom. A quarter of Antratsyt's population at the time (7100) were awarded military honors and of those awarded, six were given the title Hero of the Soviet Union and three were given the Order of Glory.

Since 2014, Antratsyt has been located on the territory of the self proclaimed Luhansk People's Republic and is not controlled by Ukrainian authorities.

Demographics
The 2010 Ukrainian Census reported that Antratsyt had a population of 78,137. The ethnic makeup was 50.5% Ukrainian, 47.5% Russian, 1% Tatar, and 1% Belarusian.
85.9% spoke Russian, 11.1% Ukrainian, 0.1% Romani, 0.1% Armenian and 0.1% Belarusian as their native language.

Geography
Even though Antratsyt is rich in water resources, which include the Nagolna River and the Mius River as well as several artificial lakes, residents are only allowed running water between the times of 18:00 to 21:00. Antratsyt's City Council presides over following outskirt villages: Bokovo-Platov, Berhny Nagolchik, Dubovsky, Krepensky, Schetovo, Kamenny, and Shahta Tsentralnaya.

Climate
Antratsyt's climate is moderate continental with hot summers and cold winters. July temperatures range from 21.8 °C to 35 °C while January temperatures range from −6 °C to −15 °C. Annual precipitation is 400–500 mm.

Culture

Religion
Orthodox Christianity is the predominant religion in Antratsyt with five churches (Holy Protection, St. Alexander Nevsky, St. George, St. Kazan, Mother of God "Skoroposlushnitsa" Nina Apostles Church). Other active religions include Jehovah Witnesses, Baptists, and Islam. The Church of Alexander Nevsky in the outskirt village Bokovo-Platov is considered an architectural monument as it was built in 1954 and survived damage when outlawed by the Soviets.

Sports
Healthy living is important to the people of Antratsyt. There are many sports teams, music bands, dance groups, and clubs held either in the sports complex "Swimming Pool" or the adjoining stadium.

Education
There are many primary/secondary schools and preschools, including a specialized school of foreign languages.
Higher education institutions (level 5 accreditation):
 Antratsyt Mining and Transport Eastern National University (a branch of the Vladimir Dal East-Ukrainian National University in Lugansk)
 Antratsyt Department of Computer Software (a branch of the Kharkiv National University of Radio Electronics)
Vocational and technical schools (level 1 and 2 accreditation):
 Antratsyt College Radio Instrument
 Antratsyt Medical School
 Antratsyt Lyceum

Economy
Located in Ukraine's heavily industrialized Donbas, Antratsyt's coal mining industry makes up 75% of the city's total production and comprises four mines (Partizanskaya Coal Mine, Komsomolskaya Coal Mine, Krepenskaya Coal Mine, "50 years of Soviet Ukraine" Coal Mine) and two mechanical repair plants (Luganskugleremont, Slavsant). The remaining economy consists of engineering companies (Ltd. "Pneumatics", AOZT "Prokat" AOOT "Color", JSC "Antratsyt Greenhouses", SE "Etalon-thermal") and food manufacturing companies (Branch LLC "Caravan" bakery, CE "Temp Ltd").

In September 2011, the Krepenskaya Coal Mine was permanently closed.

Transportation
Marshrutkas (private minibuses) and trolley buses have provided public transportation and taxis are available as well. There is also a railway station that is part of the Karahash Donetsk Railway. However, the trolleybus system is currently out of operation, and only three out of service LAZ-52522 trolleybuses remain, whereas the rest have been withdrawn.

Law and government
Antratsyt's government consists of a mayor and a city council with 46 members. Members of the city council are divided into six committees:
 Rules and Deputy Ethics
 Budget
 Industry, Transportation, and Communications
 Domestic, Housing, and Communal Services
 Land Relations and Urban Planning
 Education, Culture, Health and Sports

Notable people
 Alex Len, professional basketball player
 Vladimir Lyakhov, cosmonaut

References

Cities in Luhansk Oblast
Cities of regional significance in Ukraine
Populated places established in the Russian Empire
Don Host Oblast
1895 establishments in the Russian Empire